The 2008–09 Phoenix Coyotes season was the team's 37th season, 30th season in the National Hockey League and 13th season as the Phoenix Coyotes. It saw the Coyotes attempt to qualify for the Stanley Cup playoffs for the first time since 2002. However, during the month of March, they were eliminated from the playoffs, and ended up 13th in the NHL's Western Conference.

Preseason
The Phoenix Coyotes played eight preseason exhibition games to prepare for the regular season. Three games were at home, and the other five were on the road, including the franchise's first game back in Winnipeg, Manitoba, since the team moved from there to Phoenix in 1996. The Coyotes finished the preseason with a 2–5–1 record.

Regular season
On December 23, the Toronto-based The Globe and Mail newspaper reported that the Phoenix Coyotes team was receiving financial assistance from the NHL in the form of advances on League revenues. The Coyotes have pledged all of their assets to New York company SOF Investments LP to cover an estimated debt of $80 million. The team has lost an estimated $200 million since 2001 and may lose $30 million this season. One of the team's owners, Jerry Moyes' principal source of revenue, Swift Transportation, is also in financial difficulty. ESPN reported that the League has become involved with the operations of the Coyotes and their revenues. The NHL apparently wants to work with the City of Glendale, which owns Jobing.com Arena and receives revenues from the team. If no investors are interested in keeping the team in Phoenix, Kansas City, Winnipeg or Hamilton will likely be healthier destinations for the franchise to relocate. ESPN also reported that Moyes wants to sell his share of the team and that Hollywood producer Jerry Bruckheimer is a possible interested purchaser.

Divisional standings

Conference standings

Schedule and results

Playoffs
The Coyotes failed to make the playoffs for the sixth straight season. They last made the playoffs in 2002. This season, they were officially eliminated from playoff contention in mid-March.

Player statistics

Skaters

Goaltenders

†Denotes player spent time with another team before joining Coyotes. Stats reflect time with the Coyotes only.
‡Traded mid-season.
Bold/italics denotes franchise record.

Awards and records

Records

Milestones

Transactions

Trades

 Phoenix Coyotes elected to use the pick in the latter.
 Pick later traded to Calgary Flames.
 Pick later traded to Montreal Canadiens

Free agents

Claimed from waivers

Draft picks
Phoenix's picks at the 2008 NHL Entry Draft in Ottawa, Ontario.

See also
 2008–09 NHL season

Farm teams
San Antonio Rampage
The San Antonio Rampage are the Coyotes American Hockey League affiliate in 2008–09.

Arizona Sundogs
The Arizona Sundogs are the Coyotes affiliate in the CHL.

References

Arizona Coyotes seasons
P
P